Dicranucha nephelopis is a moth of the family Gelechiidae. It was described by Edward Meyrick in 1921. It is found in Zimbabwe.

The wingspan is about 13 mm. The forewings are fuscous. The discal stigmata are represented by obscure darker cloudy spots. The hindwings are grey.

References

Endemic fauna of Zimbabwe
Moths described in 1921
Dicranucha
Taxa named by Edward Meyrick